The State Register of Immovable (Tangible) Monuments of Ukraine is a register of some 3,300 objects of cultural heritage in Ukraine. An object of cultural heritage added to the register is known as a landmark.

The registry was established as early as 1960s. It was established according to article 5 of the second protocol to the Hague Convention for the Protection of Cultural Property in the Event of Armed Conflict, which provides for the establishment of national registers of cultural property.

The list is split by regions including cities with special status. There are two types of lists for immobile landmarks of national significance and of local significance. The landmarks are being classified as archaeological, historical, monumental art, architecture and urban planning, garden-park artistry, historical landscape, science and technology.

See also
 List of historic reserves in Ukraine

External links
 Official Register of Immobile Landmarks
 List of Immobile Landmarks at the Ministry of Culture website
 List of object of cultural heritage (official document)
 Law of Ukraine "About Protection of the Cultural Heritage" (official document)

Heritage registers in Ukraine